Bicyclogermacrene synthase (EC 4.2.3.100, Ov-TPS4) is an enzyme with systematic name (2E,6E))-farnesyl-diphosphate diphosphate-lyase (bicyclogermacrene-forming). This enzyme catalyses the following chemical reaction

 (2E,6E)-farnesyl diphosphate  bicyclogermacrene + diphosphate

The enzyme from oregano (Origanum vulgare) gives mainly bicyclogermacrene with Mn2+ as a cofactor.

References

External links 
 

EC 4.2.3